The MTs 8 (МЦ 8) is a Soviet double-barreled high-quality custom skeet shotgun.

History 
MTs 8 was designed in 1953 and produced by TsKIB SOO.

These shotguns were used by Soviet teams in shooting competitions (incl. ISSF World Shooting Championships and Olympic Games).

In October 1962, at the 38th World Shooting Championships in Cairo, Soviet shooter N. D. Durnev, armed with MTs 8 shotgun, set an absolute world record, hitting 200 of 200 targets.

In September 1981, the price of one standard MTs 8 shotgun (without second pair of barrels) was about 700 roubles.

Design 
MTs 8 is an over and under hammerless smoothbore 12 gauge shotgun, with one barrel above the other.

It is equipped with safety mechanism and ejector.

All guns have a walnut shoulder stock (with or without cheekpiece) and fore-end, some of them were decorated with engravings.

Variants 
 MTs 8-0 (МЦ 8-0) - test prototype
 MTs 8-1 (МЦ 8-1) - first model, a skeet shotgun with 750mm barrels
 MTs 8-2 (МЦ 8-2) - second model, with different trigger mechanism
 MTs 8-3 (МЦ 8-3) - third model, MTs 8-1 with second pair of 675mm barrels
 MTs 8-4 (МЦ 8-4) - MTs 8-2 with second pair of 675mm barrels

At least several MTs 8 shotguns were equipped with third pair of barrels (20/70mm R).

Museum exhibits 
 MTs 8 shotgun is in collection of Tula State Arms Museum in Tula Kremlin

References

Sources 
 Спортивное двуствольное ружьё МЦ 8 // Охотничье, спортивное огнестрельное оружие. Каталог. М., 1958. стр.53-54
 Спортивное двуствольное ружьё МЦ 8-2 // Спортивно-охотничье оружие и патроны. Бухарест, "Внешторгиздат", 1965. стр.78
 М. М. Блюм, И. Б. Шишкин. Охотничье ружьё. М., «Лесная промышленность», 1983. стр.90-91
 Ружьё двуствольное МЦ 8 // Охотничье и спортивное оружие. М., Внешторгиздат. 1989.

External links
 MTs 8 / Internet Movie Firearms Database

Double-barreled shotguns of the Soviet Union
TsKIB SOO products
Weapons and ammunition introduced in 1953